Glyn Worsnip (2 September 1938 – 7 June 1996) was a British radio and television presenter. Born in Highnam, Gloucestershire, he was most famous for his appearances on That's Life! (where he was teamed with Kieran Prendiville from 1973 to 1978) and on Nationwide.

Biography
Worsnip attended Monmouth School and after two years service in the RAF as a Photographic Intelligence Officer he graduated from St John's College, Oxford, with an honours degree in English. He trained as a journalist and actor, was a prolific writer of revues and appeared on stage in revue, farce and Shakespearian productions before his first appearance as a TV presenter on That's Life!.

In the late 1980s Glyn began experiencing the symptoms af a cerebellar disorder.  In 1986 he developed dysarthria (slurred speech) as part of an initial cerebellar ataxia diagnosis. In his autobiography, Up the Down Escalator, he mentions being diagnosed with multiple system atrophy (MSA) at the National Hospital for Neurology and Neurosurgery. MSA is a progressive, adult onset disorder characterised by any combination of parkinsonism, autonomic failure (see nervous system) and cerebellar ataxia.

The BBC did not renew his contract in 1987.

He made the programme, A Lone Voice, about his struggle with the disease, which would claim his life in 1996 at the age of 57, and which was broadcast on BBC Radio 4 in March 1988. It has been described as "the most engaging programme in Radio 4's history".

Autobiography
Glyn Worsnip – Up the Down Escalator (1990)

References

External links

1938 births
1996 deaths
English radio presenters
English television presenters
People from Highnam
Royal Air Force officers
Alumni of St John's College, Oxford
People educated at Monmouth School for Boys
Neurological disease deaths in the United Kingdom
Deaths from multiple system atrophy